Bhupendra Singh may refer to:

 Bhupendra Singh (Madhya Pradesh politician) (born 1960), Indian politician
 Bhupendra Singh (Uttar Pradesh politician), leader of the BJP in Uttar Pradesh